The Gross Domestic Income (GDI) is the total income received by all sectors of an economy within a state. It includes the sum of all wages, profits, and taxes, minus subsidies. Since all income is derived from production (including the production of services), the gross domestic income of a country should exactly equal its gross domestic product (GDP). The GDP is a very commonly cited statistic measuring the economic activity of countries, and the GDI is quite uncommon. 

In the United States, the Bureau of Economic Analysis produces figures for both the GDP and GDI. Although these should be equal for country like the United States, since they are calculated in different ways, in practice, the listed figures are different. This difference is known as the statistical discrepancy.

For oil-exports-dependent economies, there could be substantial differences between real GDP and real GDI. Real GDP statistics for those countries are often calculated by fixing prices to a certain year. This does not consider the effect of oil price volatility on the purchasing power availed to those countries. Real GDI corrects for this by introducing a trade balance term.

External links
Nalewaik, Jeremy J., "The Income- and Expenditure-Side Estimates of U.S. Output Growth" (2010).

References

National accounts